The 1835 British general election in Ireland saw a Lichfield House Compact of Whigs, Radicals, and the Repeal Association winning a majority of Irish seats. The coalition in total won 68 seats, with the Whigs and the Repeal Association winning 34 seats each.

Results

Vote totals do not include those from Dublin University.

See also
 History of Ireland (1801–1923)

1835
1835 in Ireland
Ireland
January 1835 events
February 1835 events
1830s elections in Ireland